Héctor Sanabria (born 17 August 1945) is a Mexican former footballer who competed in the 1968 Summer Olympics.

Career
After he retired from playing, Sanabria became a football manager. He led Pumas to a Mexican Primera División runners-up finish in the 1987–88 season.

References

External links

1945 births
Living people
Mexico international footballers
Footballers from Mexico City
Association football defenders
Olympic footballers of Mexico
Footballers at the 1968 Summer Olympics
Liga MX players
Club Universidad Nacional footballers
Club Universidad Nacional managers
Deportivo Toluca F.C. managers
Mexican footballers
Mexican football managers